Langeraar is a village in the community of Nieuwkoop, which is located in the Nederlandse province of South Holland. The village has 2310 inhabitants (2004).

Populated places in South Holland
Geography of Nieuwkoop